Crown Prince Hyojang (Hangul: 효장세자, Hanja: 孝章世子; April 4, 1719 – December 16, 1728), personal name Yi Haeng (Hangul: 이행, Hanja: 李緈), was the first son of King Yeongjo of Joseon and his concubine, Royal Noble Consort Jeong of the Hamyang Yi clan. In 1762, 34 years after his death, he became the adoptive father of his half-nephew, the future King Jeongjo.

Life 
Yi Haeng was the first son and second child of Yi Geum, Prince Yeoning (later King Yeongjo), by one of his concubines, Lady Yi of the Hamyang Yi clan (함양 이씨, 咸陽 李氏), a former court lady. He was born during the reign of his grandfather King Sukjong, but his birth was not made public, because his biological grandmother, Royal Noble Consort Suk, had died the previous year.

In 1720, King Sukjong was succeeded by his eldest son, Crown Prince Yi Yun (King Gyeongjong). As the new King was childless, his half-brother, Prince Yeoning, was appointed as Crown Prince (왕세제, 王世弟).

Hyojang's biological mother, Lady Yi, died the following year.

In 1724, after the death of King Gyeongjong, Yeoning was crowned as King Yeongjo, the 21st Joseon monarch. Yi Haeng was then given the title Prince Gyeongui (경의군, 敬義君) and in 1725, he was appointed as Crown Prince.

In 1726, Yeongjo selected Lady Jo of the Pungyang Jo clan, the only daughter of Jo Mun-myeong and a niece of Jo Hyeon-myeong, as his son's wife.

In 1728, the Crown Prince died in Changgyeong Palace, at the age of 9, after being ill for some months. The cause of his illness is unknown. His death was devastating to King Yeongjo, who later gave Yi Haeng the posthumous name Hyojang.

His wife, who was later honored as Queen Hyosun, outlived by more than two decades. They are buried together, in the Samneung Cluster, in Paju, Gyeonggi Province. Their tombs are known as Yeongneung.

After death 
In 1735, seven years after his death, his half-brother Yi Seon (later known as Crown Prince Sado) was born and succeeded Hyojang as Crown Prince. In 1762, Sado was imprisoned in a wooden rice chest at the order of his father, King Yeongjo, and died 8 days later, leaving his son, Yi San, as the only royal heir. Yeongjo was concerned that Yi San, being Sado's child, would be branded as "the son of a sinner" and thus become ineligible to succeed the throne, so in February 1764, he decreed that Yi San would become the adoptive son of the long-dead Crown Prince Hyojang.

In 1776, King Yeongjo died of dementia and Yi San succeeded him as King Jeongjo. Surprisingly, on his coronation day, he announced to his courtiers, "I am the son of Crown Prince Sado". In spite of this, Jeongjo respected the wishes of his grandfather and honored his adoptive father as King, and granted him the temple name Jinjong (진종, 眞宗). Hyojang's wife, the late Crown Princess Hyosun, was also honored as Queen.

In 1907, Hyojang was elevated to Emperor So (소황제, 昭皇帝) by Sunjong of Korea.

Family
 Father: Yi Geum, King Yeongjo (영조 이금) (31 October 1694 – 22 April 1776)
 Grandfather: Sukjong of Joseon (조선 숙종) (7 October 1661 – 12 July 1720)
 Biological grandmother: Royal Noble Consort Suk of the Haeju Choe clan (숙빈 최씨) (6 November 1670 – 9 March 1718)
 Adoptive grandmother: Queen Inwon of the Gyeongju Kim clan (인원왕후 김씨) (3 November 1687 – 13 May 1757)
 Biological mother: Royal Noble Consort Jeong of the Hamyang Yi clan (정빈 이씨) (1694 – 16 November 1721)
 Grandfather: Yi Hu-cheol (이후철)
 Grandmother: Lady Kim of the Gimhae Kim clan (김해 김씨)
 Adoptive mother: Queen Jeongseong of the Daegu Seo clan (정성왕후 서씨) (12 January 1693 – 3 April 1757)

'''Consort(s) and their issue(s)

Queen Hyosun of the Pungyang Jo clan (효순왕후 조씨) (8 January 1716 – 30 December 1751)
Yi San, King Jeongjo (28 October 1752 – 18 August 1800) (정조 이산)— adoptive son

Ancestry

See also 
 Crown Prince Sado
 Crown Prince Uiso
 Jeongjo of Joseon
 Yeongjo of Joseon

References

Site link 
 10살 때 요절한 효장세자 사후 양자 정조가 “아바마마” The Dongah Weekly 2010.12.27. 
 명당과 풍수 그리고 왕릉 Ohmynews 2004.09.24. 
 서울외곽 왕릉 나들이 명소로 각광 The Munhwailbo 2006.10.10. 
 망주석이 거시기? Ohmynews 2005.04.25. 

Heirs apparent who never acceded
18th-century Korean people
1719 births
1728 deaths
House of Yi
Korean princes
Executed royalty
Executed children